BBR Music Group (formerly Broken Bow Records) is an American record label based in Nashville, Tennessee. Founded in July 1999 by Benny Brown, the label specializes in country music. The label's executive vice president is Jon Loba.

Craig Morgan produced the first number-one single for the label with his 2005 hit "That's What I Love About Sunday". Jason Aldean has produced the most number-one hits on the label, with twenty-one in total.

In 2009, Broken Bow Records launched a sister label, Stoney Creek Records. In August 2015, Broken Bow launched another imprint label, Wheelhouse Records, with Trace Adkins and Granger Smith the first artists signed to it.

BBR Music Group was acquired by BMG Rights Management in February 2017.

Artists on Broken Bow Records
Jason Aldean (Macon/Broken Bow)
Tyler Farr (Night Train/Broken Bow)
Dustin Lynch
Craig Morgan (left Broken Bow in 2008; returned in 2019)
Chase Rice (Dack Janiels/Broken Bow)
Lainey Wilson

Previous Broken Bow artists

Sherrié Austin
Chad Brock
Dean Brody
Kristy Lee Cook
Crossin Dixon (moved to Stoney Creek)
Joe Diffie
Damon Gray
The Great Divide
J. Michael Harter
Joanie Keller
Krista Marie (Holeshot)
Jackie Lee
Lila McCann
Megan Mullins (moved to Stoney Creek)
Randy Owen
Jordan Rager
James Wesley
Elbert West
Blake Wise

Previous Red Bow artists

Chase Bryant
Craig Campbell (moved to Wheelhouse)
Brooke Eden
David Fanning (moved to Stoney Creek)
Rachel Farley
Joe Nichols
Kid Rock (moved to Wheelhouse)

Artists on Stoney Creek Records
Jimmie Allen
Lindsay Ell
Jelly Roll
King Calaway 
Drake Milligan
Parmalee
Frank Ray

Previous Stoney Creek artists

Ash Bowers
Crossin Dixon
Adam Craig
David Fanning
Randy Houser
Megan Mullins
Thompson Square

Artists on Wheelhouse Records
Chayce Beckham
Blanco Brown
LoCash
Madeline Merlo
Elvie Shane

Previous Wheelhouse artists

Trace Adkins
Zac Brown Band
Kristian Bush
Craig Campbell
Kid Rock
Runaway June
Granger Smith
Sykamore
Walker McGuire

BMG Nashville Artists
Brooke Eden
Alexander Ludwig
Tim Montana
Dylan Schneider

Artists on BMG Australia 
The Wolfe Brothers

Artists on BMG UK
The Shires

References

Record labels based in Nashville, Tennessee
American record labels
American country music record labels
American independent record labels
Record labels established in 1999
1999 establishments in Tennessee